Justine Simone Freha Suissa (born 21 March 1970) is a British singer-songwriter, the vocalist of trance group OceanLab.

Career and collaborations 
She has collaborated with Armin van Buuren, Markus Schulz and Robbie Rivera, and has continued to work with Above & Beyond outside of OceanLab, most recently on their 2016 world tour and participating on four songs on the band's 2018 album Common Ground. Three songs "Cold Feet", "Naked" and the album's lead single "Alright Now" she appeared as a featured artist and the song "Bittersweet & Blue", featuring Richard Bedford, which marked her first co-written credit.

Suissa came to wider notice when she featured on the hit Chicane album Behind The Sun in 2000. She formed OceanLab with Above & Beyond, achieving a top-twenty UK hit with "Satellite" in 2004. She also collaborated on a major dance hit, "Burned With Desire", with Armin van Buuren in 2003.

She has been called "[one] of the electronic world's most powerful vocalists" and "a mainstay in the trance world".

Discography

Studio albums

as OceanLab

Singles

As lead artist

As OceanLab

As Keylime

As featured artist

Guest Appearances

Songwriting and Production credits

References

External links 
 
 Above and Beyond

Living people
Trance singers
Armada Music artists
1970 births